Mariano Bordas Mon (born 14 May 1960) is a Spanish field hockey player. He competed at the 1984 Summer Olympics in Los Angeles, where the Spanish team placed eighth.

Notes

References

External links

1960 births
Living people
Spanish male field hockey players
Olympic field hockey players of Spain
Field hockey players at the 1984 Summer Olympics